Tierra del Fuego Province may refer to:

Tierra del Fuego Province, Chile
Tierra del Fuego, Antarctica, and South Atlantic Islands Province, Argentina

Province name disambiguation pages